"Mr Bleaney" is a poem by British poet Philip Larkin, written in May 1955. It was first published in The Listener on 8 September 1955 and later included in Larkin's 1964 anthology The Whitsun Weddings.

The speaker in the poem is renting a room and compares his situation to that of its previous occupant, a Mr Bleaney.

Larkin had previously used the surname Bleaney in his first novel Jill in 1946, where Bleaney is named as a classmate of the hero, John Kemp, at "Huddlesford Grammar School", somewhere in Lancashire. But the reader is not told his Christian name or indeed anything else about him. There is nothing to indicate that this is the same Bleaney who eventually occupies the room described in Larkin's poem.

Structure
The poem comprises seven four-line stanzas with a regular rhyme pattern of ABAB. The last sentence spans two stanzas:

See also
List of poems by Philip Larkin

References

External links
Text and audio recording of poem
Glyndŵr University annotated text

Poetry by Philip Larkin
Works originally published in The Listener (magazine)
1955 poems